The Prince of Wales Range is a small mountain range on the east central coast of Vancouver Island, British Columbia, Canada, located about  north of Campbell River. It has an area of 188 km2 and is a subrange of the Vancouver Island Ranges which in turn form part of the Insular Mountains.

See also
List of mountain ranges

References

External links
 

Vancouver Island Ranges